The Fight for Truth by Jude Watson is the ninth in a series of young reader novels called Jedi Apprentice. The series explores the adventures of Qui-Gon Jinn and Obi-Wan Kenobi prior to Star Wars: Episode I – The Phantom Menace.

Plot
Qui-Gon Jinn and Adi Gallia are sent with their young padawans to the planet of Kegan. They must pick up O-Lana - a Force-sensitive baby - and take her to the Jedi Temple on Coruscant without interfering with the customs and isolationist-centered ideology of the planet.

However, the nature of this culture ends up compromising the original mission when Siri Tachi and Obi-Wan Kenobi are mistaken for orphaned children, captured, and put in a school known as the Learning Circle. This school is a brainwashing camp, where Keganite children are preached the ideals of V-Tan and O-Vieve, the Benevolent Guides who are the cause of Kegan's isolationism. While at the school, Siri and Obi-Wan meet several Keganite children and discuss the reality of the situation. Meanwhile, the apprentices try to talk sense into O-Bin, their "teacher". This attempt fails, and the duo is sent to the "Relearning Circle", where drastic actions are taken to try and brainwash them.

O-Lana is also located within this Relearning Circle, and Qui-Gon and Adi are able to rescue their padawans and the baby at the same time. After this incident, the truth behind the Learning Circle is revealed, which creates an uproar against the Benevolent Guides. Kegan is eventually introduced to the ways of the Galactic Republic.

Foreshadowing 
A hint of the downfall of the Republic is seen in the visions of O-Vieve and V-Tan: she sees "evil cloaking our planet like a black cloud... the Jedi are involved."  She later goes on to delineate that "our destruction will come from an explosive device sent to destroy an entire planet without a shiver", a possible allusion to the Death Star.  V-Tan describes seeing "masked soldiers", which immediately conjures up an image of Imperial stormtroopers.

External links
Amazon.com Listing
Official CargoBay Listing
TheForce.net review

2000 British novels
2000 science fiction novels
Star Wars: Jedi Apprentice
Star Wars Legends novels
English novels